Commodore Computing International was a magazine for the Commodore range of computers, including the Commodore 64, Amiga, and Commodore PC range. The magazine was in circulation from 1980 to 1990.

History and profile
Commodore Computing International was established by Nick Hampshire in 1980. The publisher was Nick Hampshire Publications. Later issues were published by Croftward Limited. The magazine had its headquarters in London. It folded in 1990.

References

Defunct computer magazines published in the United Kingdom
Home computer magazines
Magazines established in 1980
Magazines disestablished in 1990
Magazines published in London
Ten times annually magazines
Video game magazines published in the United Kingdom
Commodore 8-bit computer magazines
Amiga magazines